A voiceless alveolar implosive is a rare consonantal sound, used in some spoken languages. A dedicated IPA letter, was withdrawn in 1993.

Features
Features of the voiceless alveolar implosive:

Occurrence 
 is found in Serer of Senegal, the Owere dialect of Igbo in Nigeria, and in some dialects of the Poqomchi’ and Quiche languages of Guatemala. Owere Igbo has a seven-way contrast among alveolar stops, . Mam has a /ɗ̥/ which alternates between [ɗ̥] and [tʼ]

See also 
 Voiced alveolar implosive

References

External links
 

Alveolar consonants
Implosives
Voiceless oral consonants